The 1931–32 British Home Championship was a football tournament played between the British Home Nations during the 1931–32 football season. It was won by England, who succeeded in beating all three of their rivals during the course of the competition.

Scotland began the tournament with victory over Ireland in Glasgow, which was followed by a heavy English victory over Ireland in Belfast. England and Scotland, now favourites for the trophy, both played and beat Wales, England at home and Scotland in Wrexham, setting up a final decider at Wembley. In their consolation game Ireland secured third place with a strong victory over Wales who therefore lost all three of their matches. In the England/Scotland final, Scotland were outclassed by their opponents who ran out 3–0 winners to take the trophy for the third year in a row.

Table

Results

References 

 British Home Championship 1919-20 to 1938-1939  - dates, results, tables and top scorers at RSSSF

1931–32 in English football
1931–32 in Scottish football
Brit
1932 in British sport
1931-32
1931–32 in Northern Ireland association football